Vaindloo (alternatively: Vaindloo saar, Swedish: Stenskär) is a small island located in the Gulf of Finland in the Baltic Sea. It belongs to Estonia, and is the northernmost land point of the country.

The island is administered by the community of Vihula in Lääne-Viru County and is an important breeding sanctuary for such birds as the common tern, Arctic tern, Tengmalm's owl, great tit, purple sandpiper, shore lark, great grey shrike, yellowhammer and others. The island is depicted on the Estonian two euro coin.

Vaindloo is also notable for its functioning lighthouse, called the Vaindloo tuletorn, it was built in 1871 and is managed by the Estonian Maritime Administration. A previous lighthouse constructed of timber was erected on Vaindloo in 1718. In addition to the lighthouse, there is a station of the Estonian Border Guard with a  observation tower and a radar on the island.

See also
List of islands of Estonia

References

Estonian islands in the Baltic
Haljala Parish
Gulf of Finland
Tourist attractions in Lääne-Viru County
Extreme points of Estonia